Daniel Alberto Willington (born September 1, 1942) is a retired Argentine football striker who played most of his career for Talleres de Córdoba and Vélez Sársfield. He also played for the Argentina national team

Playing career

Willington was born in Santa Fe but spent his childhood in Córdoba; he started his playing career in the late 1950s with local club Talleres de Córdoba.

In 1962 he joined Vélez Sársfield where he became a regular member of the first team, in 1968 he was part of the team that won Nacional 1968, the first league title obtained by the club.

After leaving Velez, Willington played for Huracán and Instituto de Córdoba before returning to Talleres de Córdoba in 1974.

Willington also had a spell playing for Veracruz during the 1970–71 Primera División de México season.

Titles

Managerial career

Willington was manager of Talleres when the team won the Argentina 2nd division in 1993–94.

Titles

References

External links

 Talleres profile
 Diario Castellanos - Memories of a great player

1942 births
Living people
Argentine people of Welsh descent
Footballers from Santa Fe, Argentina
Argentine footballers
Association football forwards
Argentina international footballers
Argentine Primera División players
Liga MX players
Talleres de Córdoba footballers
Club Atlético Vélez Sarsfield footballers
Club Atlético Huracán footballers
Instituto footballers
C.D. Veracruz footballers
Argentine expatriate footballers
Expatriate footballers in Mexico
Argentine football managers
Talleres de Córdoba managers